Anthomyia bazini is a species of fly in the family Anthomyiidae. It is found in the  Palearctic. For identification see:

References

External links
Images representing Anthomyia at BOLD

Anthomyiidae
Insects described in 1929
Brachyceran flies of Europe
Taxa named by Eugène Séguy